Daan Vekemans (born 22 February 2000) is a Belgian professional footballer who plays for Lierse Kempenzonen in the Belgian First Division B.

Club career
Vekemans made his debut for OH Leuven on 18 February 2018 in the home match against Beerschot Wilrijk, three days before his 18th birthday.

On 2 June 2022, Vekemans signed a two-year contract with Lierse.

References 

2000 births
Living people
Belgian footballers
Association football forwards
Oud-Heverlee Leuven players
S.C. Eendracht Aalst players
Lierse Kempenzonen players
Belgian Pro League players
Challenger Pro League players